is the forty-third single by the Japanese band Tokio. It was released on February 3, 2010 under the label J Storm. The single topped the Oricon weekly singles chart. The songs "Haruka" and "Dash Village" are being used as theme songs for the Dash Beach and the Dash Village respectively, both segments on Tokio's long-running variety show, The Tetsuwan Dash. The Dash Village theme was originally composed by Tokio's lead singer Tomoya Nagase just shortly after the village itself was built in 2000.  It has been used as the main theme since, though the version on this single is a re-recording.

Track listing
"Haruka" was released in three different versions:

Charts and certifications

Charts

Sales and certifications

References

2010 singles
Tokio (band) songs
Oricon Weekly number-one singles
J Storm singles
Songs written by Michiya Haruhata
2010 songs